is the sixth studio album by Japanese rock band GO!GO!7188.  The title is a play on words with the Japanese pronunciation of 569 sounding like the English Go Rock You. The limited release first press also included a DVD featuring video highlights of their first foreign tour in the United States in March 2007.

Track listing

References
 GO!GO!7188 Official Website Discography (English) Japanese

GO!GO!7188 albums
2007 albums